The Science of Sleep is the soundtrack album to the Michel Gondry film of the same name. The score was composed by Jean-Michel Bernard.

The album features the song "If You Rescue Me", originally "After Hours" by The Velvet Underground.

The song "Instinct Blues" by the White Stripes is featured in the film but is not on the soundtrack album. The song "Your Heart Is an Empty Room" by Death Cab for Cutie is featured in some versions of the trailer.

Track listing 
All tracks written by Jean-Michel Bernard except where noted.

Générique Stéphane
Générique Début
Stéphane Visite Appart
Coutances
Written by Dick Annegarn
Rêve Grosses Mains
Robinet Cellophane
Grotte Machine À Écrire
Ulcer Soul
performed by The Willowz
written by Richie Eaton
Aristurtle
Générique Stéphane TV
Tours De Cartes
My Dear Neighbours
Baignoire Martine
Gérard Explique REM
If You Rescue Me (A Cappella)
performed by Linda Serbu
music by Lou Reed
If You Rescue Me (Chanson des Chats)
performed by Gael García Bernal, Sacha Bourdo, Alain Chabat and Aurelia Petit
music by Lou Reed
Grotte Stéphane Stéphanie
Steppin' Out
performed by Kool & the Gang
written by Robert E. Bell, George M. Brown, Eumir Deodato, Robert Michens, Charles J. Smith, James W. Taylor
Week-End De Ski
Golden The Pony Boy
Making Certain
performed by The Willowz
written by Richie Eaton
Rêve Patrick Dewaere
Stéphanie Quitte Le Café
Poursuite Pouchet
Stéphanie Blues
Thème Générique Fin "Golden The Pony Boy"
written by Jean-Michel Bernard, Kimiko Ono

References 

2000s film soundtrack albums
2006 soundtrack albums